The 2009 Pacific Curling Championships were held Nov. 12-17 at the SCAP Karuizawa Arena in Karuizawa, Japan. The top two teams from the women's and the men's tournaments will qualify for the 2010 World Curling Championships.

Women's

Teams

Standings

Scores
 11-4 
 14-1 
 7-5  
 9-1 
 11-7 
 8-7 
 7-5 
 9-3 
 8-4 
 7-5  (11)
 7-4 
 9-2 
 7-3 
 9-2  
 7-5 
 11-8  (11) 
 8-5 
 9-3 
 10-3 
 12-1

Men's

Teams

Standings

Scores
 9-3 
 9-6  (11)
 8-7  (11)
 8-5  
 11-4 
 9-6 
 9-5 
 9-8  (11)
 4-2 
 9-3 
 8-3 
 9-3 
 7-6  (11)
 7-6 
 8-1 
 9-7 
 7-4 
 8-2 
 9-5 
 9-4 
 10-2 
 8-0 
 8-6 
 8-4 
 8-4 
 8-7 
 8-6 
 9-8 
 8-6 
 7-3

Sources
Official site

Pacific Curling Championships, 2009
Pacific-Asia Curling Championships
2009 in Japanese sport
International curling competitions hosted by Japan